James H. Shelton III was most recently the head of the Chan Zuckerberg Initiative's Education division. He was the formerly the Deputy Secretary of the United States Department of Education. In this role, he oversaw a broad range of management, policy, and program functions.

Previously, he served as Assistant Deputy Secretary of the United States Department of Education, overseeing the Office of Innovation and Improvement, managing a portfolio that included most of the Department's competitive programs, such as the Investing in Innovation Fund (i3), Promise Neighborhoods, and others focused on teacher and leader quality, school choice, and learning technology.

2U

Shelton served as Deputy Secretary of Education from 2013 to 2014. In 2015, he joined a company called 2U. 2U sells technology to public and nonprofit colleges. The technology helps the colleges offer online degrees.

When Shelton worked at the Department of Education, the department pursued a regulation called the "gainful-employment rule." The rule withholds student loans from students at for-profit colleges that don't show a government-chosen level of "post-graduation success."

A loophole exists in the gainful-employment rule: public and non-profit colleges are exempt. These colleges are now Shelton's customers at his job at 2U.

Earlier career
Earlier in his career, Shelton served as program director for education at the Bill & Melinda Gates Foundation, where he managed portfolios ranging from $2 to $3 billion in non-profit investments targeting increased high school and college graduation rates. Shelton has served as the East Coast lead for NewSchools Venture Fund, and also co-founded LearnNow, a school management company that later was acquired by Edison Schools. After four years in Atlanta with McKinsey & Company advising CEOs and other executives on issues related to strategy, business development, and organizational design and effectiveness, he left as a senior manager to join Knowledge Universe, Inc. There he launched, acquired, and operated education-related businesses.

Education and personal
Shelton holds a bachelor's degree in computer science from Morehouse College as well as master's degrees in business administration and education from Stanford University. Shelton currently resides in his hometown, Washington, D.C., with his wife Sonia and their two sons.

References 

Bill & Melinda Gates Foundation people
Living people
Morehouse College alumni
Stanford University alumni
United States Deputy Secretaries of Education
Year of birth missing (living people)